The culture of Thailand has evolved greatly over time, from its relative isolation during the Sukhothai era, to its more contemporary Ayutthaya era, which absorbed influences from all over Asia.  Indian, Chinese, Burmese, Lao, Khmer and other Southeast Asian influences are still evident in traditional Thai culture. Buddhism, Animism and Westernization also play a significant role in shaping the modern culture.

Thai national culture is identified differently throughout regions in Thailand where it also integrated different regional cultures such as the Lanna, Dambro, Isan, Karen, as well Chinese origin, Malay origin, Indian origin, European origin, Persian origin, Arab origin, and in the reign of King Chulalongkorn in the late 19th century, the European trend of nationalism began to insert greater influence into Thai culture. However, the promotion of civic culture reached its peak after the Siamese revolution of 1932 where a series of authoritarian regimes began to insert greater control over people's culture and lifestyles, especially under the regime of Field Marshal Plaek Phibunsongkhram.

Present day Thailand has a culture that is a combination of various local rituals from different parts of the country, along with Buddhist values and oriental trends like in many parts of Asia. The monarchy and royal institutions of Chakri dynasty remain highly revered according to original Siamese culture, whereas societal values in Thailand tend to be more collectivist and religiously secular than in other Southeast Asian cultures which have undergone influences from western colonization.

History

Norms and lifestyle

Religion

Thailand is nearly 94.6 percent Buddhist, 4.3% Muslim, and 1% Christian. Buddhist observance is mainly of the Theravada school (which includes the Thai Forest Tradition and the Dhammayuttika Nikaya and Santi Asoke sects) and an unknown minority belonging to the Mahayana school. In addition there are minorities of Muslims in Thailand (5-6 percent), Christians (1 percent), and other religions. Thai Theravada Buddhism is supported and overseen by the government, with monks receiving a number of government benefits, such as free use of public transportation.

Buddhism in Thailand is strongly influenced by traditional beliefs regarding ancestral and natural spirits, that have been incorporated into Buddhist cosmology. Most Thai people install spirit houses, miniature houses outside their dwellings, where they believe household spirits live. They present offerings of food and drink to these spirits to keep them happy. If these spirits aren't happy, it is believed that they will inhabit the household and cause chaos. These spirit houses can be found in public places and on the streets of Thailand, where the public make offerings.

Prior to the rise of Theravada Buddhism, both Indian Brahminical religion and Mahayana Buddhism were present in Thailand. Influences from both these traditions can still be seen in present-day Thai folklore. Brahminical shrines play an important role in Thai folk religion, and the Mahayana Buddhist influence is reflected in the presence of figures like Lokesvara, a form of the bodhisattva  Avalokitesvara  sometimes incorporated into Thailand's iconography.

Customs

The traditional customs and the folklore of Thai people were gathered and described by Phya Anuman Rajadhon in the 20th century, at a time when modernity changed the face of Thailand, and a great number of traditions disappeared or became adapted to modern life. Still, the striving towards refinement, rooted in ancient Siamese culture, consisting of promoting that which is refined and avoiding coarseness, is a major focus of the daily life of Thai people and high on their scale of values.

One of the most distinctive Thai customs is the wai. Used in greetings, leave-taking, as an acknowledgement, or accompanying an apology, it comes in many forms, reflecting the relative status of those involved. Generally the salutation involves a prayer-like gesture with the hands, derived from the Añjali Mudrā of the Indian subcontinent, and it also may include a slight bow of the head. This salutation is often accompanied by a serene smile symbolizing a welcoming disposition and a pleasant attitude. Thailand is often referred to as the "land of smiles" in tourist brochures.

Public displays of affection are not overly common in traditional Thai society, especially between lovers. Such actions are becoming more common, especially among the younger generation.

A notable social norm holds that touching someone on the head may be considered rude. It is also considered rude to place one's feet at a level above someone else's head, especially if that person is of higher social standing. This is because the Thai people consider the foot to be the dirtiest and lowliest part of the body, and the head the most respected and highest part of the body. This also influences how Thais sit when on the ground—their feet always pointing away from others, tucked to the side or behind them. Pointing at or touching something with the feet is also considered rude. It was reported in the Thai press that pedestrians were prohibited from climbing stairs to the Victory Monument BTS Station when a royal motorcade was due to pass on the road beneath because, according to Thai custom, feet cannot be at any point above the head of a royal family member.

Since a serene disposition is valued, conflict and sudden displays of anger are eschewed in Thai culture. For these reasons, visitors should take care not to create conflict or to display anger. Disagreements or disputes should be handled with a smile and no attempt should be made to assign blame to another. In everyday life in Thailand, there is a strong emphasis on the concept of sanuk, the idea that life should be fun. Because of this, Thais can be quite playful at work and during day-to-day activities. Displaying positive emotions in social interactions is also important in Thai culture.

Often, Thais will deal with disagreements, minor mistakes, or misfortunes by using the phrase mai pen rai, translated as "it doesn't matter". The ubiquitous use of this phrase in Thailand reflects a disposition towards minimizing conflict, disagreements or complaints. A smile and the sentence "mai pen rai" indicates that the incident is not important and therefore there is no conflict or shame involved.

Respect for hierarchy is a very important value for Thai people. The custom of bun khun emphasizes the indebtedness towards parents, as well as towards guardians, teachers, and caretakers. It describes the feelings and practices involved in certain relationships organized around generalized reciprocity, the slow-acting accounting of an exchange calculated according to locally interpreted scales and measures. It is also considered rude to step on any type of Thai currency (Thai coin or banknote), as they include a likeness of the King of Thailand.

A number of Thai customs relate to the special status of monks in Thai society. Thai monks are forbidden physical contact with women. Women are therefore expected to make way for passing monks to ensure that accidental contact does not occur. A variety of methods are employed to ensure that no incidental contact (or the appearance of such contact) between women and monks occurs. Women making offerings to monks place their donation at the feet of the monk, or on a cloth laid on the ground or a table. Powders or unguents intended to carry a blessing are applied to Thai women by monks using the end of a candle or stick. Laypersons are expected to sit or stand with their heads at a lower level than that of a monk. Within a temple, monks may sit on a raised platform during ceremonies to make this easier to achieve.

When sitting in a temple, one is expected to point one's feet away from images of Lord Buddha. Shrines inside Thai residences are arranged so as to ensure that the feet are not pointed towards the religious icons, such as placing the shrine on the same wall as the head of a bed, if a house is too small to remove the shrine from the bedroom entirely.

It is also customary to remove one's footwear before entering a home or the sacred areas within a temple, and not to step on the threshold.

In the rural areas of northeast Thailand, there are a set of customs revolving around the lunar calendar. Known as heet sip song, each lunar month has a specific heet ("tradition" or "ritual") associated with it. These "merit-making" traditions are considered critical to an individuals life and afterlife, as well as important  for community building. For example, during the first month of a lunar year, monks who have violated oaths perform penance. Lay people are expected to provide additional supplies to temples to support the monks through this time. Other traditions include celebrations of the harvest, eating of specific foods, and the popular Thai "water festival" in the fifth lunar month.

Dress

Traditional clothing

Traditional Thai clothing is called chut thai which literally means "Thai outfit". It can be worn by men, women, and children. Chut thai for women usually consists of a pha nung or a chong kraben, a blouse, and a sabai. Northern and northeastern women may wear a sinh instead of a pha nung and a chong kraben with either a blouse or a suea pat. Chut thai for men includes a chong kraben or pants, a Raj pattern shirt, with optional knee-length white socks, and a sabai. Chut thai for northern Thai men is composed of a sado, a white Manchu styled jacket, and sometimes a khian hua. In formal occasions, people may choose to wear a so-called formal Thai national costume.

Uniforms
Thailand is a uniform-wearing society. From elementary school to university, school uniforms in Thailand are the norm, with few exceptions. Teachers at elementary and secondary levels wear uniforms, usually once a week. All civil servants up to ministerial level have uniforms appropriate to their organization and rank and wear them regularly.

Cuisine

Thai dining etiquette 

Thai dining etiquette refers to the traditional and proper behaviors of Thai people while eating. Thai society has a lot of big families, so having a meal together and sharing the food between members of the family is Thai traditional dining style. Generally, Thais eat rice as the main food and share the rice side dishes with one another.

Traditionally, in Thailand, people have a meal on the floor mat and eat the food with their right hands. The rice dishes are on the outer circle while the shared dishes are in the center with shared spoons to transfer the side dish food to their own rice dish.
In the reign of King Mongkut (Rama IV); King Chulalongkorn the Great (Rama V), Prince Chulalongkorn at that time, was educated by an English woman, courted Western diplomats and leaders and travelled abroad. Observed and learnt western dining and he found out the fork and knife are not suitable for Thai food (no need to chop anything). He introduced the fork and spoon and so began the use of cutlery in Thailand. Thais use the fork to push the food onto the spoon (right hand), which then goes into your mouth instead of making the meat stable for the knife function. Nowadays, Thai dining is mixed with various countries’ dining cultures, so Thai people use a lot of styles to eat not only with spoon and fork one but also chopstick, knife and bare hand as well.

Regional Thai dining 

 Central Thailand: In central Thailand, sitting on a chair, eating at a table and using a fork, spoon and shared spoon are longstanding customs (Rama IV). For Thai rich family dining, variously shaped napkins are added on the table and also employ waiters or waitresses to serve the food and beverages beside the table.

 Northern Thailand: Thai northern people still preserve their traditional culture by using small food bowls and putting them on a kan tok (Thai northern small table). They are decorated with wood, pearl or yellowish gold. Sticky, glutinous rice is the main food eaten with shared dishes. It is contained in kratip song soong, high-height container for sticky rice. Next to the kan tok, there is kon tho din, an earthenware jar, and a kan ngeaun, a silver cup. After finishing the main course, the desserts are served and also buri chai yo
 Northeastern Thailand, (Isan): Typically the food is served on a large flower-patterned circular zinc tray. The sticky rice contained in kra tip song taei (low-height container for sticky rice). Then the desserts are served.
 Southern Thailand: The local people eat on a floor mat. The dishes are placed on the center of it. They sit in the circle and traditionally eat with their bare hands. The drinking water is contained in kan or jok, (a little cup). Nowadays, a fork and spoon are used instead of bare hands. Sitting on a chair and eating at a table now predominates. There are only few local people who still preserve the original dining style.

Ways of serving food in Thailand 
There are two main ways to serve Thai food, raad kao, individual dishes, and gap kao, separate dishes.

 Individual dishes: In the past, Thai people had large families. Due to the difficulty of eating together at the same time, placing the rice side dish and the rice on the same dish and serving individually is to some extent supplanting the traditional Thai dining style.
 Separated dishes: The rice side dishes are separately served with the rice (not same dish). Normally, this style is suitable for eating with others. The shared rice side dishes are in the center of the circle. Each has their own rice while the side dishes are shared by transferring them with the shared spoons to the individual rice dishes.

Table settings 
 Individual dishes: The spoon is on the right and the fork is on the left side of the dish.
 Shared dishes: For rice dishes, the spoon is on the right and the fork is on the left side of the dish. Shared dishes are placed in the center of the table with the serving spoons.

Manners and customs 

 Ordering: For shared dishes, the senior of the group orders their rice side dish first and then another selects dishes which everyone can eat, trying to balance a full range of tastes, ordering seafood, pork, shrimp, chicken, and vegetarian dishes. Spicy, sweet, salty, and bitter will all be represented, often all in one dish. Dishes are served serially as they are prepared, not all coming at once.
 Dining: Thai people eat using a fork and spoon. The spoon acts as the main tool and the fork is the supporting tool pushing the food onto the spoon and a shared spoon is used to convey food from a shared dish to the diner's rice dish. Some people use their own spoon to scoop the food from the shared dish directly, but this is improper. If the shared dish is curry, it is transferred to an individual little cup first. Then they sip the soup from the spoon. Sipping it from the cup directly is improper. Making undue noise during eating and sipping is impolite in Thailand. Talking during the meal is de rigueur. Thai foods contain inedible bits such as lemongrass stalks. They are put on the edge of the dish or on a dish provided for refuse. After finishing eating, placing the spoon and fork down close together on the bowl or plate, gathering any remainders to one side of the dish and stacking the empty plates at the side of the table is a signal to the server that the table may be cleared. To be polite when using a toothpick, hide the mouth with one hand as you wield the toothpick with the other.
 Bill: The bill is usually picked up and paid by the host or the wealthiest or most important or eldest person. If customers are friends the bills are usually paid separately.

Birth traditions and beliefs

Traditional principles concerning pregnancy and childbirth are largely influenced by folk beliefs, especially in rural areas of central and north Thailand. Modern practices follow the Western medical model.

Nicknames

Thai people universally have one, or occasionally more, short nicknames ( playing name) that they use with friends and family. Often first given shortly after birth by friends or an older family member, these nicknames are overwhelmingly one syllable (or worn down from two syllables to one). Though they may be simply shortened versions of a full name, they quite frequently have no relation to the person's full name and are often humorous and/or nonsense words. Babies may be given a nickname of a relative or named for a characteristic of birth, e.g., "little". Traditionally, nicknames would relate to things of low value, e.g., "dirt", which was to convince evil spirits lurking in the vicinity that the child was not worth their attention. Today this folk custom is on the decline.

Some common nicknames translate into English as "small", "fatty", "pig", "little", "frog", "banana", "green", or "girl/boy". Though rare, sometimes Thai children are given nicknames in the order they were born into the family (i.e., "one", "two", "three", etc.). Nicknames are useful because official Thai names are often long, particularly among Thais of Chinese descent, whose lengthy surnames stem from an attempt to translate Chinese names into Thai equivalents, or among Thai with similarly lengthy Sanskrit-derived names. In recent years, English language words have become popular nicknames. Examples include: "Ice" (ไอซ์); "Bank" (แบงค์); "New" (นิว); "Ball" (บอล), and even "Beer" (เบียร์).

Marriage

Thai Buddhist marriage ceremonies are generally divided into two parts: a Buddhist component, which includes the recitation of prayers and the offering of food and other gifts to monks and images of the Buddha, and a non-Buddhist component rooted in folk traditions, which centers on the couple's families.

In former times, it was unknown for Buddhist monks to be present at any stage of the marriage ceremony itself. As monks were invited to attend to the dead during funerals, their presence at a marriage (which was associated with fertility, and intended to produce children) was considered a bad omen. A couple would seek a blessing from their local temple before or after being married, and might consult some monks for astrological advice in setting an auspicious date for the wedding. The non-Buddhist portions of the wedding would take place away from the temple, and would often take place on a separate day.

In modern times, these prohibitions have been significantly relaxed. It is not uncommon for a visit to a temple to be made on the same day as the non-Buddhist portions of a wedding, or even for the wedding to take place within the temple. While a division is still commonly observed between the "religious" and "secular" portions of a wedding service, it may be as simple as the monks present for the Buddhist ceremony departing to take lunch once their role is complete.

During the Buddhist component of the wedding service, the couple first bow before the image of Lord Buddha. They then recite certain basic Buddhist prayers or chants (typically including taking the Three Refuges and the Five Precepts), and light incense and candles before the image. The parents of the couple may then be called upon to "connect" them, by placing upon the heads of the bride and groom twin loops of string or thread that link the couple together. The couple may then make offerings of food, flowers, and medicine to the monks present. Cash gifts (usually placed in an envelope) may also be presented to the temple at this time.

The monks may then unwind a small length of thread that is held between the hands of the assembled monks. They begin a series of recitations of Pali scriptures intended to bring merit and blessings to the new couple. The string terminates with the lead monk, who may connect it to a container of water that will be "sanctified" for the ceremony. Merit is said to travel through the string and be conveyed to the water. A similar arrangement is used to transfer merit to the dead at a funeral, further evidence of the weakening of the taboo on mixing funerary imagery and trappings with marriage ceremonies. Blessed water may be mixed with wax drippings from a candle lit before the Buddha image and other unguents and herbs to create a paste that is then applied to the foreheads of the bride and groom to create a small dot, similar to the marking made with red ochre on Hindu devotees. The bride's mark is created with the butt end of the candle rather than the monk's thumb, in keeping with the Vinaya prohibition against touching women.

The highest-ranking monk present may elect to say a few words to the couple, offering advice or encouragement. The couple may then make offerings of food to the monks, at which point the Buddhist portion of the ceremony is concluded.

The Thai bride price system is known as the sin sot. It roughly translates to "bride price". The groom will be expected to pay a sum of money to the family, to compensate them for the loss of a daughter and to demonstrate that the groom is financially capable of taking care of their daughter. Bride prices of 50,000 to 300,000 baht have been documented, but bride prices can sometimes run into the tens of millions of baht. In many cases, the bride price is purely symbolic and will be returned to the bride and groom after the wedding has taken place. Whether the practice of sin sot is a tradition or a scam has been debated by critics. One observed, "All that talk of face and argument for cherished tradition? It's a thinly veiled con. Behind that gobbledygook, it's the same old forces of the material world and about the parents getting enough cash to buy a new pickup, pay outstanding debts or acquire something to elevate their status." Actually, in the Thai culture the sin sot is an essential part of the marriage and no man would refuse it to the bride's family.

Thailand outlawed marital rape in 2007.

Thai people of Chinese origin may opt to mix marriage traditions; typically, they also seek monks. Other might choose to follow Chinese marriage customs, often performed in a simpler manner.

The religious components of marriage ceremonies between Thai Muslims are markedly different from those described above. The Imam of the local mosque, the groom, the father of the bride, men in the immediate family, and important men in the community sit in a circle during the ceremony, conducted by the Imam. All the women, including the bride, sit in a separate room and do not have any direct participation in the ceremony. The secular component of the ceremony, however, is often nearly identical to the secular part of Thai Buddhist wedding ceremonies. The only notable difference here is the type of meat served to guests (goat and/or beef instead of pork). Thai Muslims frequently, though not always, also follow the conventions of the Thai dowry system.

Funerals

Traditionally, funerals last for at least one week. Crying is discouraged during the funeral, so as not to worry the spirit of the deceased. Many activities surrounding the funeral are intended to make merit for the deceased. Copies of Buddhist scriptures may be printed and distributed in the name of the deceased, and gifts are usually given to a local temple. Monks are invited to chant prayers that are intended to provide merit for the deceased, as well as to provide protection against the possibility of the dead relative returning as a malicious spirit. A picture of the deceased from their best days will often be displayed next to the coffin. Often, a thread is connected to the corpse or coffin which is held by the chanting monks during their recitation; this thread is intended to transfer the merit of the monks' recitation to the deceased. The corpse is cremated, and the urn with the ash is usually kept in a chedi in the local temple.

Thai Chinese and Thai Muslim minorities bury their deceased according to the rituals of their respective communities.

Funeral services are not restricted to humans. Funerals for pets, sometimes lavish, are not uncommon, particularly in Bangkok. One company that specializes in pet funerals cremates up to 400 animals per month. The owner says that, "Bangkok is an extremely religious city ... those beliefs extend to all parts of life. Most of our customers realise that their pets can't gain enough merit on their own in this life, so it is up to them to do for them. Funerals are an obvious choice."

National anthem and respect for the flag and king

Twice a day, at 08:00 and again at 18:00, the national anthem is played by all Thai media outlets. Thais stop what they are doing and stand at attention to pay homage to the flag during the anthem. Students in school stand in front of the raised flag and sing the national anthem at 08:00 every school day. The practice dates from 1935 when the regulations for the raising and lowering of the colours was published in the Royal Gazette. The Flag Act of 1979 decreed that those who do not observe the custom by standing in silence during the anthem are subject to a fine of up to 2,000 baht and not more than one year in prison.

In a related practice, the royal anthem of the King of Thailand is played before movies, concerts, and sporting events. All are expected to stand.

Knowing one's place
Bangkok Post columnist Paritta Wangkiat maintains that Thais are expected to "know their place" in society and to be submissive. A result is that those from the lower ranks of the social order are often treated dismissively. People of different social classes are never treated equally in her view. As people fear to speak out about their rights, or those of others, submissiveness and deference to authority make the behaviour a "perfect match for an authoritarian regime." Persons who stand up for their beliefs and challenge the status quo are scorned as people who don't know their proper place in society. Thai culture places great emphasis on hierarchy and knowing one's place in it.

Writer and editor Wasant Techawongtham, seeking to explain governmental missteps, observed that, "As everybody in Thailand knows, we are a society of conformity. We conform to tradition, to authority, to power, to wealth. There is little room for people to think outside the box or to imagine the impossible. And what little window of opportunity exists for civilians, that window is forever closed for government workers."

Thai toilets
The "bidet shower" is common in Thai toilets, as evidenced by an uproar by parliamentarians when it was disclosed that the new parliament building was not equipped with "bum guns".

Arts

Traditional arts

Thai visual arts were traditionally Buddhist only. Thai Buddha images from different periods have a number of distinctive styles. Thai temple art and architecture form a unique combination of elements derived from ancient Siamese architectures. Thai contemporary art often combines traditional Thai elements with modern techniques.

Literature in Thailand is heavily influenced by Indian Hindu culture. The most notable works of Thai literature are a version of the Ramayana, a Hindu religious epic, called the Ramakien, written in part by Kings Rama I and Rama II, and the poetry of Sunthorn Phu.

Traditional Thai paintings showed subjects in two dimensions without perspective. The size of each element in the picture reflected its degree of importance. The primary technique of composition is that of apportioning areas: the main elements are isolated from each other by space transformers. This eliminated the intermediate ground, which would otherwise imply perspective. Perspective was introduced only as a result of Western influence in the mid-19th century. Monk artist Khrua In Khong is well known as the first artist to introduce linear perspective to Thai traditional art.

There is no tradition of spoken drama in Thailand, the role instead being filled by Thai dance. This is divided into three categories: Khon, 'Lakhon, and Likay, Khon being the most elaborate and Likay the most popular. Nang drama, a form of shadow play, is found in the south.

There is also Thai folklore, Sri Thanonchai as an example.

Dance

The very first detailed European record of khon and other classical Siamese dances was made during the Ayutthaya Kingdom. It described a dramatic tradition and style that are almost identical to the Thai traditions we still see today. Historical evidence clearly establishes that the Thai art of stage plays must have already been perfected by the 17th century. Louis XIV, the Sun King of France, had a formal diplomatic relation with Ayutthaya's King Narai. In 1687, France sent the diplomat Simon de la Loubère to record all that he saw in the Siamese Kingdom and its traditions. In his account Du Royaume de Siam, La Loubère carefully observed the classic 17th century theatre of Siam, including an epic battle scene from a khon performance, and recorded what he saw in great detail:

"The Siamese have three sorts of Stage Plays: That which they call Cone [khon] is a figure dance, to the sound of the violin and some other instruments. The dancers are masked and armed, and represent rather a combat than a dance. And though every one runs into high motions, and extravagant postures, they cease not continually to intermix some word. Most of their masks are hideous, and represent either monstrous Beasts, or kinds of Devils. The Show which they call Lacone is a poem intermix with Epic and Dramatic, which lasts three days, from eight in the morning till seven at night. They are histories in verse, serious, and sung by several actors always present, and which do only sing reciprocally.... The Rabam is a double dance of men and women, which is not martial, but gallant... they can perform it without much tying themselves, because their way of dancing is a simple march round, very slow, and without any high motion; but with a great many slow contortions of the body and arms."

Of the attires of Siamese khon dancers, La Loubère recorded that: "[T]hose that dance in Rabam, and Cone, have gilded paper-bonnets, high and pointed, like the Mandarins caps of ceremony, but which hang down at the sides below their ears, which are adorned with counterfeit stones, and with two pendants of gilded wood.

Today "ram Thai", 'Thai dance'. Thai dance, like many forms of traditional Asian dance, can be divided into two major categories that correspond roughly to the high art (classical dance) and low art (folk dance) distinction.

Although traditional Thai performing arts are not as vibrant as they once were, suffering inroads from Western entertainment and generally changing tastes, Thai dance drama is not extinct. What survives displays the elegance of an art form refined over centuries and supported by regal patronage.

Aside from folk and regional dances (southern Thailand's Indian-influenced Menora dance, for example), the two major forms of Thai classical dance drama are khon and Lakhon nai. In the beginning both were exclusively court entertainments and it was not until much later that a popular style of dance theater, Likay, evolved as a diversion for the common folk who had no access to royal performances. Apart from Lakhon nai, Lakhon chatri is also one of the most important Thai dances.

Music

The Music of Thailand includes classical and folk music traditions, e.g., Piphat and Mor lam, respectively, as well as Thai pop music, e.g., "String". Thai classical music is synonymous with those stylized court ensembles and repertoires that emerged in its present form within the royal centers of Central Thailand some 800 years ago. These ensembles, while being slightly influenced by older practices and repertoires from India, are today uniquely Thai expressions. While the three primary classical ensembles, the Piphat, Khrueang sai and Mahori differ in significant ways, they all share a basic instrumentation and theoretical approach. Each employ the small ching hand cymbals and the krap wooden sticks to mark the primary beat reference.

Several kinds of small drums (klong) are employed in these ensembles to outline the basic rhythmic structure (natab) that is punctuated at the end by the striking of a suspended gong (mong). Seen in its most basic formulation, the classical Thai orchestras are very similar to the Cambodian (Khmer) pinpeat and mahori ensembles, and structurally similar to other orchestras found within the widespread Southeast Asian gong-chime musical culture, such as the large gamelan of Bali and Java, which most likely have their common roots in the diffusion of Vietnamese Dong-Son bronze drums beginning in the first century.

Traditional Thai classical repertoire is anonymous, handed down through an oral tradition of performance in which the names of composers (if, indeed, pieces were historically created by single authors) are not known. However, since the beginning of the modern Bangkok period, composers' names have been known and, since around the turn of the century, many major composers have recorded their works in notation. Musicians, however, imagine these compositions and notations as generic forms which are realized in full in idiosyncratic variations and improvisations in the context of performance.

Sports

Muay Thai (RTGS: Muai Thai, lit. "Thai boxing") is a native form of kickboxing and Thailand's signature sport. It incorporates kicks, punches, knees and elbow strikes in a ring with gloves similar to those used in Western boxing and this has led to Thailand gaining medals at the Olympic Games in boxing.

Association football has overtaken muay Thai as the most widely followed sport in contemporary Thai society. Thailand national football team has played the AFC Asian Cup six times. The team reached the semifinals in 1972 and the round of 16 in 2019. The country has hosted the Asian Cup twice, in 1972 and in 2007. The 2007 edition was co-hosted together with Indonesia, Malaysia and Vietnam. It is not uncommon to see Thais cheering their favourite English Premier League teams on television and walking around in replica kit. Another widely enjoyed pastime, and once a competitive sport, is kite flying.

Takraw (Thai: ตะกร้อ) is a sport native to Thailand, in which the players hit a rattan ball and are only allowed to use their feet, knees, chest, and head to touch the ball. Sepak takraw is a form of this sport which is similar to volleyball. The players must volley a ball over a net and force it to hit the ground on the opponent's side. It is also a popular sport in other countries in Southeast Asia. A rather similar game but played only with the feet is Buka ball.

Architecture

The Major part of the country's cultural legacy and reflects both the challenges of living in Thailand's sometimes extreme climate as well as, historically, the importance of architecture to the Thai people's sense of community and religious beliefs. Influenced by the architectural traditions of many of Thailand's neighbors, it has also developed significant regional variation within its vernacular and religious buildings.

Buddhist temples in Thailand are known as "wats", from the Pāḷi vāṭa, meaning an enclosure. A temple has an enclosing wall that divides it from the secular world. Wat architecture has seen many changes in Thailand in the course of history. Although there are many differences in layout and style, they all adhere to the same principles.

As the phrase "Thai stilt house" suggests, one universal aspect of Thailand's traditional architecture is the elevation of its buildings on stilts, most commonly to around head height. The area beneath the house is used for storage, crafts, lounging in the daytime, and sometimes for livestock. The houses were raised due to heavy flooding during certain parts of the year, and in more ancient times, predators. Thai building and living habits are often based on superstitious and religious beliefs. Many other considerations such as locally available materials, climate, and agriculture have a lot to do with the style.

Traditional games

 One-legged rabbit is a type of "catch-me" game. The catcher will call out the rabbit, and the rabbit must stand on one leg and jump or tiptoe to catch other players and switch to rabbit instead. This game will exercise your legs and practice balancing on one leg. The number of players are divided into two teams, or may not have a team at all. Normally, there are two or more players. At the first time, the player will select the rabbit or team by "rock-paper-scissors". The loser becomes a rabbit.

In the case of solo player, the rabbit must stand on one leg, then jump to chase and touch any part of the body of other children who have run away. Everyone must stay within the designated area. A player who runs out of space loses the game and must be switched to rabbit, but if the rabbit is exhausted and cannot stand on one leg, it was that defeated and must be punished.

In team play, the rules are similar to the solo player, but the rabbit team will send a representative to catch the other team to all the people. Those arrested will have to wait outside until the rabbit team can catch all of the rival teams. Rabbit team can switch to teammates to catch on until they are exhausted, and if the all of the members in rabbit team are exhausted and cannot stand on one leg, the rabbit team lose the game and must be punished too.

 Banana stalk hobby horse riding
Banana stalk hobby horse riding or "khee ma khan kluay" in Thai is a traditional game of Thailand that Thai kids frequently played in the past. They use a banana stalk to make the parts of a horse such as head, ear, and horsetail. The materials for making a banana rib hobby horse are banana stalk, knife, small bamboo pin, and string. First, find a banana stalk around 1.5 m long. Cut it in the form of the head, neck, and ears, then use a small bamboo pin to connect the ear to the head of a horse. The remaining part of the banana stalk becomes a horsetail. Attach a string between the head and the tail of this banana stalk horse and place on the shoulder of the rider.

Kids sit on the horse and pretend they are riding a real horse, shouting "hee hee" or "yee haaah", sounds typical of people on horseback. They may race with friends if they have more than two players. The team that runs faster is the winner.

Holidays

Important holidays in Thai culture include Thai New Year, or Songkran, which is officially observed from 13–15 April each year. Falling at the end of the dry season and during the hot season in Thailand, the celebrations notoriously feature boisterous water throwing. The water throwing stemmed from washing Buddha images and lightly sprinkling scented water on the hands of elderly people. Small amounts of scented talcum powder were also used in the annual cleansing rite. In recent decades, water fights have been increasingly industrialised with use of hoses, barrels, squirt guns, water-filled surgical tubing, and copious amounts of powder.

Loi Krathong is held on the 12th full moon of the Thai lunar calendar, usually early-November. While not a government-observed holiday, it is nonetheless an auspicious day in Thai culture, in which Thai people "loi", meaning "to float" a "krathong", a small raft traditionally made from elaborately folded banana leaves and including flowers, candles, incense sticks, and small offerings. The act of floating away the candle raft is symbolic of letting go of all one's grudges, anger, and defilements so that one can start life afresh on a better footing.

National Elephant Day or Chang Thai Day is a holiday in Thailand, held on March 13, which celebrates the cultural and historical significance of the elephant in Thailand.

Pastimes

Reading and Internet
Eighty-eight percent of Thai people read books and spend an average of 28 minutes per day doing so, according to a poll conducted by the Thai Publishers and Booksellers Association (PUBAT) and Chulalongkorn University's Faculty of Economics and Research Centre for Social and Business Development.

A total of 3,432 Thais aged 15–69 in 12 provinces, including Bangkok, Chiang Mai, Songkhla, Nakhon Si Thamarat, Nakhon Ratchsima, and Khon Kaen, were interviewed from December 2014 to January 2015. While 88% of Thai respondents said they read books, 12% said they did not. They cited as reasons lack of time, bad eyesight, and dislike of reading.

Averaged over the entire population, Thais spend 28 minutes a day reading books. The reading sub-set of the population averages 46 minutes a day. Of this group, those aged under 20 spend the most time reading books, 56 minutes a day. That figure shrinks as people age until they reach 61, when people tend to get back into reading.

By comparison, 71% of Thais use the Internet almost every day for an average of 92 minutes. Those who spend most time on the Internet are people under 20, on average 224 minutes a day, while those over 61 spend ten minutes a day on-line.

In 2013 the Thai National Statistical Office conducted a reading survey that found that Thais aged over six spent an average of 37 minutes a day reading. The survey was not focused specifically on reading books, but also reading journals, the Internet, tablet computers, and smart phones.

See also

 Betel Chewing In Thailand
 Buddhist temples in Thailand
 Cinema of Thailand
 Folklore of Thailand
 Ghosts in Thai culture
 List of museums in Thailand
 Media of Thailand
 Ministry of Culture (Thailand)
 Phya Anuman Rajadhon
 Racism in Thailand
 Royal Flags of Thailand
 Thai Buddhist sculpture
 Thai temple art and architecture
 Thailand National Artist

References

Further reading

External links

Ministry of Culture
Thailand stories and folklore